Tatjana Maria was the defending champion, but chose not to participate this year.

Sofia Kenin won the title, defeating Belinda Bencic in the final, 6–7(2–7), 7–6(7–5), 6–4, despite being three championship points down in the second set.

Seeds

Draw

Finals

Top half

Bottom half

Qualifying

Seeds

Qualifiers

Draw

First qualifier

Second qualifier

Third qualifier

Fourth qualifier

Fifth qualifier

Sixth qualifier

References

External links
 Main draw
 Qualifying draw

Mallorca Open - Singles
Singles